"Rainbow" is a song by Italian singer-songwriter Elisa. It was the second single from the 2001 album Then Comes the Sun and the first single released from the American compilation Dancing, published in 2008. The song was a hit in Italy.

Music video
The American music video of Rainbow was filmed in July 2008 with the participation of Lacey Schwimmer from So You Think You Can Dance.

Track listing 
Standard edition
 "Rainbow" (Bedroom Rockers Remix)
 "Rainbow" (Radio edit)
 "Heaven Out " (Sensual Heaven remix)
 "Heaven Out " (Live at Tropical Pizza 14/11/01)

US edition
 "Rainbow" (Glen Ballard remix)
 "Rainbow" (Album Version)

Chart performance

References

2002 songs
2002 singles
Songs written by Elisa (Italian singer)
Elisa (Italian singer) songs
Song recordings produced by Glen Ballard